Sin Poh may refer to:
 Sin Pin Jit Poh, a defunct Malaysian newspaper; Guang Ming Daily claimed as a successor
 Sin Chew Jit Poh, a Malaysian newspaper that still publishing as Sin Chew Daily
 Sin Chew Jit Poh (Singapore), a defunct Singapore newspaper; was the parent company of Malaysian edition
 Sing Tao Holdings, publisher of Sing Tao Daily until 2001, a successor of "Sin Poh Amalgamated (Hong Kong)"
 Sin Poh (Star News) Amalgamated

See also
 Sing Pao (disambiguation)